Catephia xanthophaes is a species of moth of the  family Erebidae. It is found in Angola.

References

Endemic fauna of Angola
Catephia
Moths described in 1911
Moths of Africa